Chorouda is a village of the Lagkadas municipality. Before the 2011 local government reform it was a part of the municipality of Vertiskos. The 2011 census recorded 51 people in the village. Chorouda is a part of the local community of Vertiskos.

See also
 List of settlements in the Thessaloniki regional unit

References

Populated places in Thessaloniki (regional unit)